Spotting is a technique used in climbing, especially in bouldering, where the climbers are close to the ground and ropes are not normally used. The spotter stands below the climber, with arms raised or at the ready. If the climber falls, the spotter does not catch the climber, but redirects the climber's fall to land safely on a bouldering mat. At the very least the spotter ensures that the climber's head and back do not strike the ground directly. If the climber jumps down, the spotter can also help prevent stumbles and injuries on uneven ground. The spotter should stand with fingers together (known as "using spoons") to avoid broken fingers.

A spotter should always be used for accident prevention.  A climbing spotter will typically stand with arms held up with hands in a supporting position for more or less vertical climbs. If the climber falls, the spotter's hands lightly hold the climber's hips or lower back, near the climber's center of gravity.  This allows the spotter to help guide the climber's fall effectively, helping keep the center of gravity over the feet. When on steeper, past vertical climbs, the spotter will hold the climber's arms out in a cradling position.  If the climber falls, the spotter supports the upper and middle back, helping the climber land on his or her feet.

A spotter may also be used to help accomplish new climbing moves.  Often much of the energy in learning a new move is exerted in simply holding onto the rock.  If a spotter puts even the slightest pressure on the climber's upper back or upward pressure on the hips during a move, this will often give the climber the extra relief needed to learn the move.  Once the move is learned, it can usually be practised and mastered without the extra help.

The term spotting originated in 1930, when a new gymnastics coach at the University of Illinois, Hartley Price, painted  diameter white circles on the gymnasium walls, calling them "spots". Seeing the "spots", gymnasts were supposed to think 'safety' and look for those who could assist them through one element or another.

References

Climbing techniques
Bouldering